Lies for the Liars is the third studio album by American rock band the Used. It was released on May 22, 2007, and was certified gold by the RIAA on February 28, 2019.

Background
On September 12, 2006, it was announced that drummer Branden Steineckert left the band. However, a day later, Steineckert explained that he was in fact kicked out of the band: "Quinn, Bert and Jeph have agreed that they no longer want to play music with me." In addition, they added that recording was nearly done. However, two months later the band was still working on the album.

In total, the band recorded 19 songs, from about 40 that were written in preparation for the album. Dean Butterworth of Good Charlotte recorded the drums for the album.

Release
On January 17, 2007, Dan Whitesides, formerly of New Transit Direction, was announced as Steineckert's replacement. From mid February to early April 2007, the band co-headlined the 2007 edition of the Taste of Chaos tour. On February 24, Lies for the Liars was announced for release in May. "The Bird and the Worm" was made available for streaming on March 19 through AOL Music, and released to radio on April 3. In April, the band performed in the UK as part of the Give it a Name festival. A music video for "The Bird and the Worm" was released on April 26. A behind-the-scenes video of the music video was released on May 11. Lies for the Liars was made available for streaming on May 18 through their Myspace account, and released four days later through Reprise. The special edition version includes a bonus DVD, slightly different artwork, special casing, and a 24-page booklet packed with vibrant images of the band and Chadam. The special casing is fashioned to look like a book, with the pages within holding several photographs of the band and different fictional characters as well as the lyrics. The DVD has a 20-minute feature on the making of the album.

The group were initially planned to appear on the Warped Tour from late June to early July. However, shortly prior to the beginning of the tour, it was announced that McCracken would be having vocal surgery, which forced the band to abandon the tour. A music video was released for "Pretty Handsome Awkward" on July 23, 2007. The song was released to US alternative radio on August 21 and released to UK radio on September 3. From mid August to early October, the band went a tour of the US with the Bled, Army of Me and the Josephine Collective, which included an appearance at the X96 Big Ass Show radio festival. In between this, the group performed on the main stage at Reading and Leeds Festivals in the UK. Following the tour, the group went visited Australia and New Zealand on the Taste of Chaos Down Under tour. Further tours of Japan and Europe were undertaken in November. A demo version of "Smother Me" was posted on the group's Myspace on November 29, 2007. A few outtakes from the recording sessions, namely "Dark Days", "Slit Your Own Throat", "Devil Beside You", "My Pesticide", "Sun Comes Up", "Sick Hearts" and "Tunnel", were released on the Shallow Believer EP in February 2008.

Reception

The album peaked at number 5 on the Billboard 200. It charted at number 39 in the UK and became the group's fastest-selling album in that country.

Track listing

Additional track information 
The Used recorded 19 songs during the Lies for the Liars recording session.  The 8 b-sides from the session are titled "Dark Days", "Devil Beside You", "Silt Your Own Throat", "My Pesticide", "Sun Comes Up", "Sick Hearts", "Pain" and "Tunnel".  The b-sides were released as bonus tracks from select retailers and later appeared on Shallow Believer. "Tunnel" is the only track that is different between the early bonus track release and Shallow Believer release a year later.  A hidden track was also included titled "Queso" which is a 29-second song that is about a quesadilla. Though it was first released on the Used's MySpace in late 2006, most fans talked about it on message boards and thought of it as a joke, it was not expected to actually be on the album.  A demo version of "Smother Me" was also posted on the band's MySpace page.

Personnel 

The Used
 Bert McCracken – vocals, piano
 Jeph Howard – bass, backing vocals
 Quinn Allman – guitars, backing vocals

Performers
 John Feldmann – vocals, gang vocals
 Arin Older – additional vocals on "The Bird and the Worm", gang vocals
 Ashley Grobmeyer – screams on "Wake the Dead"
 Quinn Allman – gang vocals
 Bert McCracken – gang vocals
 Jeph Howard – gang vocals
 Matt Appleton – gang vocals
 Joe Manganiello – gang vocals
 Danny Feinberg – gang vocals
 Dan Whitesides – gang vocals
 Monique Powell – vocals on "Smother Me" and "Wake the Dead"
 Julian Feldmann – additional vocals on "Find a Way"

Design
 Alex Pardee – creative direction, design, photography, creation of "Chadam" and other characters
 MONSTER EFFECTS – creature effects, masks, props, building of Chadam.

Musicians
 Matt Appleton – horns, keys, organ, cadence on "Find a Way"
 Dean Butterworth – drums, percussion
 John Feldmann – additional percussion, keys, cadence on "Find a Way", string arrangement on "The Bird and the Worm", "Earthquake" and "Smother Me"
 Suzie Katayama – string contractor

Technical and production
 John Feldmann – producer, programming
 Chris Lord-Alge – mixing
 Matt Appleton – engineering
 Jon – drum tech
 Allan Hessler – tech
 Todd Parker – tech
 Joe Gastwirt – mastering

Managerial
 Craig Aaronson – A&R
 Tim Carhart – A&R coordinator

Technical and production – DVD
 CW Mihlberger – director, editor, filming
 Adam Peterson – director, editor, animation sequence, filming
 Chris Trovero – director, editor
 Jeph Howard – animation sequence
 Quinn Allman – animation sequence, filming
 David May – DVD producer
 Raena Winscott – DVD producer
 Tony Friedman – DVD post audio
 Sean Donnelly – DVD menus
 Jim Atkins – DVD authoring
 Sean Cowling – DVD coordination

Charts

Certifications

Release history 

Standard edition

Special edition

References

External links

 Lies for the Liars at YouTube (streamed copy where licensed)
 

2007 albums
Reprise Records albums
The Used albums
Albums produced by John Feldmann